Francisco de Vera-Villavicencio, O. de M. (died 1616) was a Roman Catholic prelate who served as Bishop of Perpignan-Elne (1613–1616),
Auxiliary Bishop of Seville (1603–1613), Titular Bishop of Madaurus (1603–1613).

Biography
Francisco de Vera-Villavicencio was ordained a priest in the Order of the Blessed Virgin Mary of Mercy.
On 4 Jul 1603, he was appointed during the papacy of Pope Clement VIII as Titular Bishop of Madaurus and Auxiliary Bishop of Seville.
In 1603, he was consecrated bishop by Fernando Niño de Guevara, Archbishop of Seville. 
On 18 Mar 1613, he was appointed during the papacy of Pope Paul V as Bishop of Perpignan-Elne.
He served as Bishop of Perpignan-Elne until his death on 4 Jul 1616.

References

External links and additional sources
 (for Chronology of Bishops) 
 (for Chronology of Bishops) 
 (for Chronology of Bishops) 
 (for Chronology of Bishops) 
 (for Chronology of Bishops) 
 (for Chronology of Bishops) 

17th-century French Roman Catholic bishops
Bishops appointed by Pope Clement VIII
Bishops appointed by Pope Paul V
1616 deaths
Mercedarian bishops